Kaolin is an unincorporated community in Chester County in southeastern Pennsylvania in the United States. The community is located on Pennsylvania Route 41 between Avondale to the northwest and Hockessin, Delaware to the southeast.

History
Kaolin was named after the valuable deposits of kaolin in the vicinity.

References

Unincorporated communities in Chester County, Pennsylvania
Unincorporated communities in Pennsylvania